Achhut Kannya is a 1936 Indian Hindi film. Among the early super-hits in the Bombay film industry, the film deals with the social position of Dalit girls and is considered a reformist period-piece.

The film was one of several successful Bombay Talkies collaborations between Franz Osten, Niranjan Pal, Himanshu Rai, and their leading lady, Devika Rani. Music is by Saraswati Devi and lyrics by J.S. Kashyap and this was Ashok Kumar's debut film

The movie stars Ashok Kumar and Devika Rani in the lead roles.

Plot 
The movie is set in the 1900s. Mohan, a Brahman by caste, sells daily essentials to villagers. He is a kind soul and helps those really in need. Dukhiya, a kacchu by caste, is a railway crossing guard. Though an untouchable, he saved Mohan's life from a snake-bite and since then Mohan and Dukhiya develops deep friendship. As such, Pratap, son of Mohan (Ashok Kumar) and Kasturi, daughter of Dukhiya, (Devika Rani) also become friends since childhood. Growing up together, they fall in love with each other. Babulal, the village doctor, holds severe grudges against Mohan and always looking for any chance to slander his reputation in village.

Pratap being a Brahmin boy and Kasturi being an untouchable girl (achhut), social conventions of that time preclude any possibility of these two lovers uniting.
 
Thereafter, due to many evil twists and turns of fate and instances, Pratap ends up  marrying Meera (Manorama), while Kasturi marries Mannu (Anwar). Both of them are unable to forget their first love, but tries hard to make their respective marriages work. Unfortunately, the situation gets compounded by the fact that Mannu also has a first wife, Kajri, with whom he is estranged due to excessive interference from his in-laws. The hitherto smug Kajri suddenly feels threatened by the arrival of a new woman in her husband's life and arrives at Mannu's house unannounced.

Meera tries hard to win Pratap's attention towards herself and confesses her troubles to her friend, Kajri. Kajri who is also unable to gain attention of Mannu towards her blames Kasturi for their similar misfortune. Thus, she poisons Meera's mind. The two of them hatch a diabolical conspiracy to discredit Kasturi in the eyes of Mannu and villagers. They take Kasturi along to a fair mela in the neighbouring village, and then abandons her there. While searching for them in fair, Kasturi meets Pratap, who has a food stall there and both of them decides to return to their village. Meanwhile, Meera and Kajri as per their plan upon reaching their village tell Mannu that Kasturi has eloped with her lover Pratap.

Seeing Pratap and Kasturi returning together, misguided and enraged Mannu attacks Pratap, exactly when his Bullock-cart just arrives at the railroad crossing. There ensues a fisticuffs between the two, even as a train rushes towards them and the bullock-cart. Desperate to save all lives at stake, Kasturi rushes towards the train, signaling and imploring the driver to stop and in the process gets herself killed. That act of selflessness makes her a martyr in the eyes of the villagers, despite her lowly origins.

Cast
Devika Rani as Kasturi
Ashok Kumar as Pratap
Manorama as Meera
Anwar as Mannu
Pramila as Kajari
Kamta Prasad as Dukhia
Kusum Kumari as Kalyani
P. F. Pithawala as Mohan
Kishori Lal as Babulal
N. M. Joshi as Inspector of Police
Ishrat	as Sukhlal
Khosla	as Patient

Principal Dancers
Mumtaz Ali
Sunita Devi

References

External links

 
 Full movie on YouTube, also  and 
 Achhut Kannya at National Film Archives Pune
 Watch Achhut Kanya entirely annotated with archival material at Indiancine.ma

1936 films
1936 romantic drama films
1930s Hindi-language films
1930s Urdu-language films
Indian black-and-white films
Films directed by Franz Osten
Films about the caste system in India
Articles containing video clips
Indian romantic drama films
Films scored by Saraswati Devi